Ancistrus eustictus is a species of catfish in the family Loricariidae. It is a freshwater fish native to South America, where it occurs in the Baudó River basin in Colombia. The species reaches 18 cm (7.1 inches) SL and it is known to inhabit high-altitude areas, with the holotype being reportedly collected from a location approximately 914 m (3000 ft) above sea level.

References 

eustictus
Fish described in 1945
Catfish of South America